Scanlens is a brand of trading cards first produced in the 1930s and given away with packets of sweets and chewing gum.

The first sports-themed cards series were produced in limited quantities in 1963 featuring 18 players from the Victorian Football League and players in the New South Wales Rugby Football League and Queensland Rugby League competitions which have since become highly sought after, with some cards commanding a price of up to $2000 each. 
Scanlens went on to produce further modern card sets (sport and non sport) between 1963 and 1991, many of which have since become collectors' items.

References

External links

Chewing gum
Trading cards
Trading card companies
Australian rules football culture
Rugby football culture